Josiah Preston (1885 – after 1909) was an English professional footballer born in Derby who played in the Football League for Birmingham.

Preston played for Derby Midland and Burton United before joining Birmingham in 1908. Described as "a strong and solid reserve", he was one of several full backs vying to succeed Frank Stokes and Watty Corbett, who were coming to the end of their careers. He had a run of seven games in the 1909–10 season, beginning with a 3–0 defeat at Clapton Orient on 20 November 1909, but returned to non-league football the following year with Halesowen.

References

1885 births
Year of death missing
Footballers from Derby
English footballers
Association football fullbacks
Derby Midland F.C. players
Burton United F.C. players
Birmingham City F.C. players
Halesowen Town F.C. players
English Football League players
Date of birth missing
Place of death missing